Miss Europe 1950 was the 14th edition of the Miss Europe pageant and the third edition under the Mondial Events Organization. It was held in Rimini, Italy on 9 September 1950. Hanni Schall of Austria, was crowned Miss Europe 1950 by out going titleholder Juliette Figueras of France.

Results

Placements

Contestants 

 - Hanni Schall
 - Nicole Poncelet
 - Marianne Schleiss
 - Hilkka Marjatta Ruuska† 
 - Claude Renault
 - Susanne Charlotte Erichsen†
 - Hilda Lesman
 - Giovanna Pala
 - Aud Grenness (Aud Grenes)
 - Maria da Conceição Pinto Viergas Louro
 - Graziana Simonici
 - Ebbe Adrian
 - Frances Freiburghaus
 - Güler Ariman (Güler Arıman)

Notes

Debuts

Withdrawals

Returns

"Comité Officiel et International Miss Europe" 1951 Competition

From 1951 to 2002 there was a rival Miss Europe competition organized by the "Comité Officiel et International Miss Europe". This was founded in 1950 by Jean Raibaut in Paris, the headquarters later moved to Marseille. The winners wore different titles like Miss Europe, Miss Europa or Miss Europe International.

In 1951, for the first time ever, the competition took place in Palermo, Italy. There were 7 delegates all from their own countries. At the end, Jacqueline Grenton of Switzerland was crowned as Miss Europa 1951 thus becoming the first ever Miss Europa.

Placements

Contestants

 - Monique Vallier
 - Giovanna Mazzotti
 - Elizabeth Mayerhoffer
 - Jacqueline Grenton

References

External links 
 

Miss Europe
1950 beauty pageants
1951 beauty pageants
1950 in Italy
1951 in Italy